Bhaktaraj is a Bollywood film. It was released in 1943. The film was produced by "Jayant Desai Productions" and directed by Jayant Desai. The cast included Vasanti, Vishnupant Pagnis, E. Billimoria, Kaushalya and Dixit.

Cast
 Vishnupant Pagnis
 Vasanti
 Mubarak
 Kaushalya
 Dixit
 E. Bilimoria
 Bhagwandas

Soundtrack
The film's music was composed by C. Ramchandra, with the lyrics written by D. N. Madhok. The singers were Vasant, Vishnupant Pagnis, Kaushalya, Amirbai Karnataki, Kantilal and Rajkumari.

Songs

References

External links
 

1943 films
1940s Hindi-language films
Indian black-and-white films
Films directed by Jayant Desai